Perfect is the enemy of good is an aphorism which means insistence on perfection often prevents implementation of good improvements. The Pareto principle or 80–20 rule explains this numerically.  For example, it commonly takes 20% of the full time to complete 80% of a task while to complete the last 20% of a task takes 80% of the effort.  Achieving absolute perfection may be impossible and so, as increasing effort results in diminishing returns, further activity becomes increasingly inefficient.

Origin 

In the English-speaking world the aphorism is commonly attributed to Voltaire, who quoted an Italian proverb in his Questions sur l'Encyclopédie in 1770: "".  It subsequently appeared in his moral poem, which starts 

Previously, around 1726, in his , Montesquieu wrote "" (The best is the mortal enemy of the good).

Antecedents 

Aristotle and other classical philosophers propounded the principle of the golden mean which counsels against extremism in general.

Its sense in English literature can be traced back to Shakespeare,  In his tragedy, King Lear (1606), the Duke of Albany warns of "striving to better, oft we mar what's well" and in Sonnet 103:

Variations 

The 1893 Dictionary of Quotations from Ancient and Modern, English and Foreign Sources lists a similar proverb, which it claims is of Chinese provenance: "Better a diamond with a flaw than a pebble without one." 

More recent applications include Robert Watson-Watt propounding a "cult of the imperfect", which he stated as "Give them the third best to go on with; the second best comes too late, the best never comes"; economist George Stigler's assertion that "If you never miss a plane, you're spending too much time at the airport"; and, in the field of computer program optimization, Donald Knuth's statement that "Premature optimization is the root of all evil".

See also

Gold plating (software engineering)
If it ain't broke, don't fix it
Nirvana fallacy
Satisficing
Utopia
Wabi-sabi
Worse is better

References

Further reading
 

Proverbs